Richard Clough was a merchant.

Richard Clough may refer to:

Richard Clough, High Sheriff of Denbighshire 1787
Richard Clough (journalist) on Los Angeles Business Journal
Dick Clough (1884–1915), Australian rules footballer

See also
Richard Clough Anderson Sr.
Richard Clough Anderson Jr.